Edmund Sheffield, 2nd Earl of Mulgrave (December 161124 August 1658) was an English peer who supported the Parliamentary cause during the English Civil War period.

His father was Sir John Sheffield (drowned in 1614), heir to Lord Sheffield, and his mother was Grizel Anderson, daughter of Sir Edmund Anderson, chief justice of common pleas. As grandson of the First Earl, Mulgrave succeeded to his title in October 1646, and also succeeded his grandfather as Vice-Admiral of Yorkshire. He sat in the House of Lords until its abolition, and was a member of the Council of State during the Commonwealth. In 1658 he was nominated as a member of Cromwell's Upper House, but, like most of the other peers summoned, declined to serve. He died later the same year.

Mulgrave married Elizabeth Cranfield, daughter of the Earl of Middlesex. Their son, John, who succeeded to the earldom, was later created Marquess of Normanby and Duke of Buckingham and Normanby, and was Lord Privy Seal and Lord President of the Council during the reign of Queen Anne.

References

Sources
 
 The Concise Dictionary of National Biography
Cobbett's Parliamentary history of England, from the Norman Conquest in 1066 to the year 1803 (London: Thomas Hansard, 1808) 
 House of Lords Journal, 12 November 1646
 Institute of Historical Research: Lists of office holders

|-

1611 births
1658 deaths
17th-century English nobility
Edmund
Earls of Mulgrave
Barons Sheffield
People of the English Civil War